The Division of Darwin was an Australian Electoral Division in Tasmania.

The division was created in 1903 and abolished in 1955, when it was replaced by the Division of Braddon. It was named after Charles Darwin, who visited Australia in 1836. It is not related to the city of Darwin in the Northern Territory.

It was located in north-western and western Tasmania, including the towns of Burnie and Devonport.

After 1917, it was always in the hands of the non-Labor parties. Prominent members included King O'Malley, a colourful Labor member, Sir George Bell, Speaker of the House, and Dame Enid Lyons, the first woman elected to the House of Representatives.

Members

Election results

Notes

Darwin
Constituencies established in 1903
1903 establishments in Australia
Constituencies disestablished in 1955
1955 disestablishments in Australia